Jackson T. “Steve” Stephens (born July 24, 1952) is an American businessman and the founder, chairman, and CEO of Exoxemis, Inc., a biomedical research company. He is the former chairman of The Club for Growth and the current chairman of The Club for Growth Foundation. Stephens also co-founded the Arkansas Policy Foundation. Stephens has recorded in Nashville studios and released several albums (one nominated for a Grammy Award) on which he wrote most of the music and lyrics while playing all the keyboards.

Biomedical research: Exoxemis

In 1987, Stephens began a quest that turned into a lifelong passion to explore and understand the role of oxygen in biological systems for use in diagnostics and therapeutics. To help direct that effort, Stephens hired Robert C. Allen, Ph.D., M.D.  One of the great chemists of the modern era, Dr. Allen had discovered cellular chemiluminescence. Allen’s understanding of the quantum mechanics of the neutrophil, white blood cells, and the human immune system was the key to his invention of a chemiluminescence diagnostic system that provides comprehensive, point-of-care analysis of a patient’s illness-disease profile. In developing this diagnostic system, Dr. Allen also discovered the role that myeloperoxidase plays in the human immune system and its natural ability to selectively bind and kill pathogens. Dr. Allen previously worked as a pathologist for Basil Pruitt, surgeon, known as one of the founding fathers of modern trauma and burn medicine.

Stephens founded Exoxemis in 1987 and since that time has collaborated with Dr. Allen on the development and commercialization of Zempia®,  the company’s trade name for the first-ever, topical antiseptic that works safely in blood. Stephens and Dr. Allen have co-authored a number of peer-reviewed journal articles on the microbicidal activity of myeloperoxidase (MPO), the active pharmaceutical ingredient in Zempia®. In 2010, the American Society for Microbiology (ASM) published a seminal paper in The Journal of Infection and Immunity titled “Myeloperoxidase Selectively Binds and Selectively Kills Microbes.” An initial patent (priority date February 1991) was issued on the Zempia® technology in 1999. This initial patent was the foundation and enabled subsequent method and composition patents to be filed worldwide.

Government and politics

The Club for Growth

Stephens joined The Club for Growth board in 2003 along with Richard (Dick) Gilder, Thomas L. (Dusty) Rhodes, Art Laffer, and Stephen Moore. Stephens was chairman of the Club from 2010 to 2019.

By 2019, Club-endorsed candidates formed the backbone of the conservative caucus in the Senate to include: Senator Ted Cruz (Texas), Senator Tim Scott (South Carolina), Senator Pat Toomey (Pennsylvania), Senator Marco Rubio (Florida), Senator Rand Paul (Kentucky), Senator Ron Johnson, Senator Mike Lee (Utah), Senator Tom Cotton (Arkansas), Senator Ben Sasse (Nebraska), Senator Dan Sullivan (U.S. senator) (Alaska), Senator Marsha Blackburn (Tennessee), and Senator Josh Hawley (Missouri).

Upon joining the board, Stephens helped expand the Club’s focus from Republican House primaries into U.S. Senate races. In the 2004 Senate race, Pat Toomey challenged Senator Arlen Specter (Pennsylvania) who was supported by President George W. Bush and his cabinet and a cadre of professional politicians including Bush’s senior adviser and deputy chief of staff, Karl Rove. Stephens was Toomey’s principal supporter. Although Toomey lost the primary by less than 2 percent, the campaign effectively launched the Club into the center of key Senate races and established the Club as a significant force in American politics. Toomey became the Club’s president, and in 2010 was elected senator (Pennsylvania).

The Club for Growth Foundation
Stephens was elected chairman of the Club’s Foundation in 2019. The Foundation has further expanded vote studies and public policy research to include state house and senate legislative races. Every year, the Club for Growth Foundation publishes a vote study on the U.S. Congress allowing citizens to see how congressional members vote on key economic issues (most notably tax increases and government spending).

Arkansas Policy Foundation

Stephens cofounded the Arkansas Policy Foundation in 1995. In 1996, Stephens helped recruit Madison Murphy who led the Murphy Commission (1996–1999).

Stephens chaired the Murphy Commission’s statewide education work group. In 2001, Stephens helped establish the very first open-enrollment public charter school in Arkansas: Academics Plus Charter Schools, Inc. Stephens later served on its board.

Music

Stephens began playing an electric piano with his boyhood friend Jimmy Roberts in 1964. The duo formed a band and after several name changes decided on Rayburn. They played clubs, opened for Three Dog Night, and acted as Chuck Berry’s backing band when he played in town. In 1974, Jimmy Roberts died of spinal cancer, and Stephens put his musical interests aside. In 2009, Jimmy Roberts’ older brother suggested a reunion of living band members. Since 2010, Rayburn has released two albums, one of which was nominated in three Grammy categories.

Early career

From 1973 to 1983, Stephens worked in all aspects of his family’s firm, Stephens Inc., in Little Rock. At that time, it was an investment/merchant bank, which took Walmart, J.B. Hunt, and others public while making investments for its own account. During his 10 years at Stephens, the firm became the largest investment bank off Wall Street in terms of capital and remained so until 1985.

Education

Stephens received a bachelor's degree in business and economics from Hendrix College in Conway, Arkansas.

Stephens’ founding of Exoxemis in 1987 guided him on a lifelong path of independent empirical studies, reading, and research in the fields of oxygen physics, cellular luminescence, biochemistry, and antiseptics.

References

Living people
Businesspeople from Little Rock, Arkansas
Hendrix College alumni
Arkansas Republicans
1952 births
Conservatism in the United States